Mideniya is a village in Sri Lanka. It is located in the Hambantota District in the Southern Province, Sri Lanka

It is falls under the purview o the governor of the Southern Province

See also
List of towns in Central Province, Sri Lanka

References

External links

Populated places in Central Province, Sri Lanka